Neoclytus columbianus is a species of beetle in the family Cerambycidae. It was described by Ernst Fuchs in 1963.

References

Neoclytus
Beetles described in 1963